John 1:25 is the twenty-fifth verse in the first chapter of the Gospel of John in the New Testament of the Christian Bible.

Content
In the original Greek according to Westcott-Hort, this verse is:
Καὶ ἠρώτησαν αὐτόν, καὶ εἶπον αὐτῷ, Τί οὖν βαπτίζεις, εἰ σὺ οὐκ εἶ ὁ Χριστός, οὔτε Ἠλίας, οὔτε ὁ προφήτης;  

In the King James Version of the Bible the text reads:
And they asked him, and said unto him, Why baptizest thou then, if thou be not that Christ, nor Elias, neither that prophet?

The New International Version translates the passage as:
They questioned him, "Why then do you baptize if you are not the Christ, nor Elijah, nor the Prophet?"

Analysis
The scribes and Pharisees challenge John, asking by what authority does he baptize publicly, and how does he act with authority so that the people flock to him, and were subject to a baptism of Penance? MacEvilly notes that this they thought as being particularly daring on the part of John, since he denied being a prophet; for the prophets foretold that when Christ would come, baptism was to be administered to the people (Ezech. 36:25; Zach. 13:1). And the Pharisees who were learned in the law, knew this. They supposed that such a baptism could only be done by the Messiah or by his accompanying prophet.

Commentary from the Church Fathers
Origen: "The questions of the priests and Levites being answered, another mission comes from the Pharisees: And they that were sent were of the Pharisees. So far as it is allowable to form a conjecture from the discourse itself here, I should say that it was the third occasion of John’s giving his witness. Observe the mildness of the former question, so befitting the priestly and levitical character, Who art thou? There is nothing arrogant or disrespectful, but only what becomes true ministers of God. The Pharisees however, being a sectarian body, as their name implies, address the Baptist in an importunate and contumelious way. And they said, Why baptizest thou then, if thou be not that Christ, neither Elias, neither that Prophet? not caring about information, but only wishing to prevent him baptizing. Yet the very next thing they did, was to come to John’s baptism. The solution of this is, that they came not in faith, but hypocritically, because they feared the people."

Chrysostom: "Or, those very same priests and Levites were of the Pharisees, and, because they could not undermine him by blandishments, began accusing, after they had compelled him to say what he was not. And they asked him, saying, Why baptizest thou then, if thou art not the Christ, neither Elias, neither that Prophet? As if it were an act of audacity in him to baptize, when he was neither the Christ, nor His precursor, nor His proclaimer, i. e. that Prophet."

References

External links
Other translations of John 1:25 at BibleHub

01:25
Baptism
Elijah